Lusigetti is a settlement in Kenya's Kikuyu Constituency Kiambu County.

References 

Kiambu County